Andaryan gold mine is the largest gold mine in the East Azerbaijan Province of Iran. It is located in Varzaqan County adjacent to the Andaryan village. The open-pit mine began operations in 2011.

References

Surface mines in Iran
Buildings and structures in East Azerbaijan Province
Varzaqan County